The Sisters Grimm is a children's fantasy series written by Michael Buckley and illustrated by Peter Ferguson. The series features two sisters, Sabrina Grimm and Daphne Grimm, and consists of nine novels that were published from 2005 to 2012.

Summary
After their parents disappear, Sabrina and Daphne Grimm go through a series of foster homes. In each place, they must work as maids, servants, and other jobs inappropriate for children. They even experience abuse and neglect. Their caseworker, Ms. Minerva Smirt, is a harsh and uncaring woman who repeatedly fails to assign them to a safe home. After all of their troubles, they end up in the care of their long-lost grandmother, who they believed was dead and Sabrina worries is crazy, due to the old woman's belief that fairy tales exist.

Soon, the sisters learn that the town of Ferryport Landing has Everafters, living characters from fantasy and fairy tales. Working as detectives in their family business, the sisters Grimm solve mysteries possibly connected to the disappearance of their parents. While following their family traditions, they also must deal with Puck, a trickster fairy boy who lives with them. Unfortunately for the sisters, the Scarlet Hand, an evil group of Everafters, seeks to escape from the town and take over the world. A magical barrier created by a witch keeps the Everafters within the town. The only known way to destroy the barrier is to kill all the members of the Grimm family.

Books
 The Fairy-tale Detectives: The Fairy Tale Detectives introduces two orphaned sisters, Sabrina and Daphne Grimm, who are sent to live with their mysterious grandmother, Relda Grimm. Grandmother Grimm lives in a strange town in New York State, known for its extraordinary number of unexplained and unusual crimes. As soon as the sisters arrive, they begin to unravel a mystery that leads to their ancestors' magical beginnings. Sabrina and Daphne learn they are descendants of the Brothers Grimm, who were actually detectives of the magical phenomenon perpetrated by the Everafters, a parallel race of magical beings. They soon discover it is the Grimm family's legacy to keep the Everafters in line and the two sisters are the sole heirs to this challenge. In the first book of the series, the girls are pitted against giants, who have been rampaging through town in their search for an Englishman named Jack who is in jail for an unspecified crime.
 The Unusual Suspects: The Sisters Grimm start school at Ferryport Landing Elementary. Daphne gets Snow White for a teacher, while Sabrina's stuck with Mr. Grumpner and a class of mildly psychotic sixth graders. When Mr. Grumpner is murdered in a particularly unusual way, it is up to the Grimms to find the Everafter who did it. A great friend turns into a great enemy (a member of the Scarlet Hand), and when the school is blown up by Rumpelstiltskin, who turns into a human bomb, Mr. Canis doesn't make it out in time.
 The Problem Child: The Sisters Grimm face their parents' kidnappers, an organization of Everafters who call themselves the Scarlet Hand. One of them turns out to be Little Red Riding Hood, and the other, the Jabberwocky, an unstoppable killing machine. The girls have little hope of rescuing their mother and father until their long-lost Uncle Jake returns home with stories of a weapon, now missing, that can kill the Jabberwocky. Sabrina, given a wand by Uncle Jake, gets a magic addiction. Only the Blue Fairy can put the pieces of the Vorpal Blade together. Mayor Charming, for once, has competition for the mayoral election by the Queen of Hearts. Puck's wings are ripped off in a Jabberwocky attack at a diner.
 Once Upon a Crime: Sabrina just wants to be normal — no detecting, no dangerous escapes, and especially no Everafters, but New York City is a city filled with wand-wielding fairy godfathers, swashbuckling Wall Street pirates, subway stealing dwarfs, and the murderer in their midst. This makes Sabrina feel sick about her old home. She doesn't think it safe there anymore either. The girls and their friends must figure out who killed Puck's father, King Oberon, while coming to terms with their mother's secret life.
 Magic and Other Misdemeanors: Someone is stealing the magical possessions of the most powerful Everafters in town. Granny is distracted by Mayor Heart's campaigning against human residents, the girl detectives are on their own. Puss in Boots (now an exterminator), Cinderella (a radio relationship counselor), Briar Rose (owner of a coffee shop), and their old enemy, Prince Charming, are among the many suspects. The girls get sucked into the future and are surprised at what they see.
 Tales from the Hood: A kangaroo court of Everafters, led by the Queen of Hearts (Alice's Adventures in Wonderland), is determined to find Mr. Canis guilty and force the Grimms out of Ferryport Landing. Meanwhile, Puck has decided to focus more on his mischievous ways, making a few new troublemaker friends to protect the family. It's up to Sabrina and Daphne to find evidence to save Mr. Canis.
 The Everafter War: Sabrina and Daphne's parents awake from their sleeping spell, but they are caught in the middle of a war between the Scarlet Hand and Prince Charming's Everafter army. As the family works to help the prince and protect their friends, Sabrina faces the family's deadliest enemy - the mysterious Master - who reveals a secret.
 The Inside Story: Picking up where the cliffhanger ending of book seven left off, this book follows Sabrina, Daphne, and Puck through the world of the Book of Everafter, where all the fairy tales are stored and enchanted characters can change their destinies. The girls (and Puck) must chase the Master through a series of stories, where they're willing to change what they need in order to save their baby brother. Soon, however, they are confronted by The Editor - the book's guardian - who, along with an army of tiny monsters known as Revisers, threaten the children with dire consequences if they don't stick to the stories. They move from one legendary tale to the next doing their best to find the Master and stop his plan to steal and inhabit the child's body. Along the way they'll play the roles of Alice, Mowgli, Jack the Giant-killer, Hansel and Gretel, and the Headless Horseman in the stories they visit, in order to find their brother in time. They also must find out what is hidden in the margins of Snow White, the story that the Master was born in.
 The Council of Mirrors: The final battle has begun. Sabrina, Daphne and their family and friends must fight the Master, who has failed to escape Ferryport Landing. After his failure, the Master turns to plan B: kill every last member of the Grimm family until the barrier surrounding the town falls. The Grimm family and the Scarlet Hand must join hands against the Master. It includes peeks at Sabrina's later life.
 The Sisters Grimm: A Very Grimm Guide: Released in January 2012, the Guide (edited by Puck) contains extra information about Ferryport Landing, the characters and the series itself.

The Grimm Family
 Sabrina Grimm: Sabrina is shown having long blond hair and big blue eyes. Sabrina is said to also resemble her mother as she has her face. She is stubborn and does whatever she believes is right. She usually takes on the role as a leader when she, Daphne, and Puck are alone, but it is later shown that she sometimes finds that having everyone look at her for the answer is stressing. She is sometimes overprotective of Daphne but it's only because she wants her sister to be safe. She is always fighting with Puck, but they have feelings for each other. In the first couple of books she has plenty of suspicion, none too good. Her sister and her are constantly bickering. But only because Sabrina doesn't really consider Daphne's opinions, she is constantly arguing with everybody in her family because of her choices. In the series' epilogue she ends up marrying Puck (supposedly) and has two daughters, Emma and Alison. The latter also turned out to be a fairy princess.
 Daphne Grimm: Daphne is the younger sister of Sabrina, and is shown having brown hair that is usually in ratty braids. She is quite kind, and headstrong, mixed with stubbornness, too. She is Sabrina's reason for not giving up hope. She has her own special quirks, such as biting her palm when she is excited and making up words for her own language and adding some funny ones from the english language too (such as gravy, which means cooler than cool). She gets tired of Sabrina always protecting her, and grows up to the point where she can give Sabrina some helpful advice. Puck calls her "Marshmallow" and she is close to the family dog, Elvis. It's also mentioned that she has a large appetite and can sleep through anything, except breakfast. Sabrina states that the word "full" isn't in Daphne's vocabulary. Daphne later gets married and is expecting twins. The identity of her husband is not mentioned in the book, but she does mention that Pinocchio is "hot" at Sabrina's wedding.
 Mr. Canis/Big Bad Wolf/Tobias Clay: Mr. Canis is introduced as Relda Grimm's friend in the first book. He's the Big Bad Wolf. His eyes glow bright blue in photographs because of his Big Bad Wolf traits. He struggles with his Wolf self in the beginning of book two and is anything but "fine". The Grimms saved him from the wolf, and he is now on a mission to regain the memories of his life before the wolf. He is described as very skinny, and wears a suit that seems too big for him. He also is the adoptive father of red riding hood.
 Relda Grimm: As the grandmother of Sabrina and Daphne, Relda suddenly shows up and takes them in 18 months after the girls were put in the foster system. She has gray hair with specks of red and green eyes. She is the one who introduces them to the land of Everafters and magic. Granny Relda had red hair in her youth. She has green eyes and a round face. She usually wears a hat with a sunflower on it, and is known for the odd dishes that she makes. Later in the books, the master inhabits her body. She also appears to be dead in the epilogues (which is strange because she is an Everafter).
 Jake Grimm: The Grimm girls' uncle, who appears in the third book and is a major character from then on. He has a huge crush on Sleeping Beauty, but sadly, her fairy godmothers disapprove of him. He is later dating her and was going to propose to her but Sleeping Beauty died. He has a huge long coat, sort like a duster, it has tons of pockets on it, all filled with magical things. He supposedly killed Basil Grimm, his own father, and is devastated by it. He has blond hair and blue eyes and also a healing broken nose.
 Puck: Puck is a 4,000-year-old fairy who lives in the form of an 11-year-old boy. Puck is an Everafter with blond hair, green eyes and a mischievous grin. He has pink streaked insect-like wings which pop out of his back at will. He ends up living with the Grimms after helping them in the first book—he was living in the forest before moving in with Granny Relda, only going to her house for a free meal—and officially becomes part of the family. He is also known as the Trickster King, and is always playing pranks, usually targeted at Sabrina. He fights using his wooden sword, can fly while carrying Sabrina and Daphne, can transform into many forms (like turning his head into a donkey's, or morphing elephant legs), and - using a bottle of soda - can burp a stream of fire. He likes being the center of attention, and is jealous when he is not in the spotlight. Despite the overtone of annoyance between him and Sabrina, the preteens have let it slip that they have romantic feelings for each other. Puck even begins aging again, and it was suggested by Daphne that Puck's aging is due to him wanting to keep up with Sabrina. He is part of the royal faerie family back in New York City (they gave the impression they disapprove of Puck's behavior), although Puck mourned his father, Oberon, after his death, and appears to care for them, despite his protests to the contrary. He has a younger brother named Mustardseed, a mother named Titania and an ex-fiancee named Moth (who Puck refused to wed, causing his falling-out with his family). He despises being mistaken for Peter Pan, and can get extremely angry when he does. He is also suspected to be Sabrina's husband in the epilogue and in the "old" future.
 Mirror: He is the guardian of the mirror that kept some of the most dangerous tools found in some famous fairy tales such as "Dorothy's slippers" or "the Magic Carpet" in the hands of wrongdoing it can lead to chaos (hall of wonders). He is considered a part of the Grimm family, and Sabrina states, "in many ways, he's my best friend". He was not loved being the first of the mirrors. He is the master and has described himself as being unloved and abandoned. He also finds himself like Sabrina. He is defeated when Sabrina shows him that if he is like her, he has experienced love. 
 Basil Grimm: Sabrina and Daphne's little brother who was discovered in the book seven. He has bright red hair and green eyes. The Master kidnapped him because he wanted to take over his body to escape the barrier of Ferryport Landing. He is named after his deceased grandfather who died while combating the jabberwocky who escaped while the barrier was lifted. Basil was born when his parents were asleep by powerful magic and was abducted by the master.
 Elvis: He is the Grimm family dog, and often seems to understand what the Grimm's are telling him to do. He is a Great Dane, and is harmless as long as he likes someone. His best friend is Daphne, and they are great companions. Elvis even jumped into the bath with Daphne. He can't have sausages, as they make him very gassy. Although he is a friendly, slobbery dog, he is very good at finding clues.

Everafters
 Mayor/Prince William Charming: Younger brother to Prince Atticus and son of King Thorne and Queen Catherine. He was a playboy, spent too much money, and drank a lot of wine until Bunny Lancaster rewrote him to be good, kind, handsome, and heroic. He was the former mayor of Ferryport Landing. He is portrayed as a greedy, self-absorbed person. He is intent on buying up the town to make it into his own personal kingdom; he becomes an unlikely ally for the Grimms. He is shown to have a crush on Snow White, even proposing to her although she says no.
Baba Yaga: An extremely old witch. She helps the girls several times throughout the series, in exchange for a price. Sabrina doesn't like her very much, but she proves to be essential in the final battle. She is eventually in a coven of witches with Bunny Lancaster (the evil queen) and Morgan Le Fay. She only agreed to this if Bunny Lancaster gave Baba Yaga her eyes (her perspective and secrets of magic).
 Officer Ernest Hampstead: One of the Three Little Pigs (others are Mr. Swineheart and Mr. Boarman). He is the sheriff of Ferryport Landing until Mayor Heart fired him. He is a great friend of the Grimms. He stays in New York in the fourth book to be with his girlfriend Bess (aka the Cow who Jumped Over the Moon). He was also the one who gave Daphne the key to the safety deposit box with a weapon that could defeat Mr. Canis if he ever went out of control.
 The Queen of Hearts: Current mayor of Ferryport Landing. She hates the Grimms and is a part of The Scarlet Hand, and it is said that she "looks like she applied her makeup with a paint ball gun". The Queen along with Sheriff Nottingham are killed by Jake in revenge for their role in the murder of Briar Rose.
 Snow White: Daughter of Bunny Lancaster, she was originally married to Prince Atticus until he abused and killed her. Bunny had to rewrite the Book of Everafter to keep her away from Prince Atticus and make her marry Prince William Charming, causing her to hate her mother because she thought Bunny poisoned her with an apple. She left Charming at the altar because she felt she needed to be more independent, but she and Mayor Charming never really got over each other. She is a teacher at the school in Ferryport Landing and runs a self-defense group called the Bad Apples. She is a fierce soldier and boot camp officer in the Everafter War and a very good friend to the Grimms. In the final book she not only marries Prince William Charming but becomes the new Mayor of Ferryport Landing.
 Little Red Riding Hood: At the beginning of the series, she was portrayed as a little girl whose mind was horribly affected. She was normally found replacing her family with others she kidnapped and flying on her "Jabberwocky" until the Grimms saved her by using 'The North Wind' a kazoo that was also used on Mr. Canis to rid him of the Wolf. She now lives with the Grimm family and is a shy, sweet girl. Sabrina often shows contempt for the girl as she was the one who stole her parents though "Red" tries her hardest to become accepted by Sabrina. In the final book she took the Big Bad Wolf's spirit into herself so she could stop Prince Atticus.
Nottingham: The sheriff of Ferryport Landing who replaced Hampstead. Nottingham is evil, but acts as the Queen of Hearts' minion for most of the series. However, it is shown that he is actually more evil and loyal to the Scarlet Hand then Heart. He plans to kill all the Grimms in order to lower the barrier, allowing the Hand to conquer the world.
 Bess: Hampstead's girlfriend first introduced in the book four. She is actually The Cow Who Jumped Over The Moon. She returns to Fairy Port Landing with Hamstead, and they have children.
 Veronica Grimm: Mother to the Grimm girls and Basil Grimm ll and daughter-in-law to Relda Grimm, and also the wife to Henry Grimm and sister-in law to Jake Grimm. She is under a sleeping spell for most of the books. She's described with jet-black hair, high cheekbones, bright eyes, great gams, and was a knock out. She also has a fierce attitude.
 Henry Grimm: Father to the Grimm girls and son to Relda Grimm, in addition as husband to Veronica Grimm and brother to Jake Grimm. He is also under a sleeping spell for most of the books. He is shown not to like Puck and thinks of him as immature. He is described with a warm, round face, and blond hair. He is often shown as overprotective to The Grimm girls.
 Mr. Seven: Mayor Charming's former assistant. He was often forced to wear the "Idiot Hat". He proves to be a fierce warrior in the seventh book. He is the seventh of the Seven Dwarves. He later proves to be Prince Charming's best and most loyal friend and one of the few Ever Afters who remember Prince Atticus. When he is killed, he is mourned by all and Charming refers to him as his best friend.
 The Mad Hatter: Judge for Mr. Canis' trial. He is extremely crazy which is why Mayor Heart appoints him as the judge. He states Mr. Canis guilty, and orders him hanged.
 The Little Mermaid: She had the sword needed to cut open the barrier but would not hand it over; Uncle Jake, Sabrina, and Daphne stole it from her. She is also very fat, she took to eating when her husband left her for another woman. She refers to humans as "topsiders".
 Goldilocks: She was Henry Grimm's old girlfriend. She saved him from the sleeping spell he was under. Friend to the Three Bears and has the ability to talk to animals, she has long golden hair and a button nose complete with freckles, she is described as "pretty and nice in a ditsy kind of way".
 Briar Rose: Uncle Jake's girlfriend. Good friend to the Grimms and often helps them. Her fairy godmothers don't approve of Uncle Jake and try not to leave the two of them alone. She is beautiful, and is also a former wife of Prince Charming. She passes away from a dragon the hand sends after her and the family.
 Prince Atticus Charming: Prince William Charming's evil older brother and true heir to their father's throne. He was introduced in the eighth book. He is so cruel, evil, and violent that he had to be banished into margins of the Book of Everafter. There he stayed for years, stealing magical objects from its wearer. The world knows the story of "Snow White and the Seven Dwarfs" but the original tale was called The Murderous Blood Prince, which was about Prince Atticus and how he married Snow White to unite their kingdoms. Unlike Prince William Charming he abused Snow White and later killed her. Bunny Lancaster tried to reason with Atticus's father, King Thorne about the marriage but he refused to listen, so Bunny took the Book of Everafter and tried to rewrite Prince Atticus to be a better person, but he was too evil to be changed. She then gave him a mentor to learn great things from, and Prince Atticus slit the mentor's throat. She gave Prince Atticus a caring fairy godmother but Prince Atticus tore the wings off of the fairy godmother and threw her into the fireplace. Then Bunny realized someone else had to marry Snow White so she chose Prince William Charming. She rewrote Charming into a good, kind, handsome, and heroic man, but even that wasn't enough. The problem was that the story needed a new villain, so Bunny rewrote herself as the infamous Wicked Queen who poisoned Snow White just to save her. Needless to say, the plan worked. But Prince Atticus wasn't happy about the change, so when Mirror freed him from the Book of Everafter, he swore that he would kill Bunny for imprisoning him, and his brother for stealing the throne and Snow White from him, and take Snow White as his wife. His magic armor was torn off by Little Red Riding Hood who took the Big Bad Wolf's spirit into herself, and he was killed by Snow White.
 Morgan le Fay: A gorgeous, curvy witch with dark black hair who seems to be able to romantically charm every man she meets. She is part of a coven of witches with Baba Yaga and Bunny Lancaster and led by Daphne.
 Bunny Lancaster/The Wicked Queen: Contrary to popular belief, she wasn't evil and wasn't a stepmother to Snow White, but rather her true mother. She loved Snow White and wanted what was best for her, rather than hated her. She however hated Prince Atticus, the violent man who possessed Snow White's hand in marriage, so much that she tried to reason with Atticus's father, King Thorne, about the marriage. He refused to listen, so Bunny took the Book of Everafter and rewrote the story of "The Murderous Blood Prince" into "Snow White and the Seven Dwarfs" to save Snow White from Prince Atticus, and rewrote Prince William Charming into a good, kind, handsome and heroic man. But in the process she was forced to write herself as the villain, making Snow White hate her forever. She is far more powerful than most Everafters in Ferryport Landing, and the only rival to her powers is Baba Yaga. She's also responsible for creating the magic mirrors.
 Mustardseed: Mustardseed is Puck's brother and lives in New York. He is known to be much nicer and more polite and cleaner than Puck. He has only appeared in book 4.
 Alison and Emma Grimm: The two daughters of Puck and Sabrina, who only appear at the end of book 9. They act like Sabrina and Daphne when they were younger, and Emma seems to take after Puck a little bit.  Fourteen-year-old Alison takes Sabrina's stubborn, older sister role, and Emma takes the young, angelic younger sister role who aggravates her older sister. Emma was teasing Alison about a person named Parker, and it is implied Alison likes this boy. Allison has wings like her father, and both girls are considered fairy princesses as their father is King of the Fairies.
Harry: He shows up in the third book. Harry is the guardian of a later version of magic mirrors. He sacrifices himself to save the girls. Harry runs Billy Charming's 'Hotel of Wonders'.
The Master: The mysterious leader of the Scarlet Hand. The Grimms do their best to find out his identity. Several times, they have confronted a villain they think is the Master, but the villain is revealed not to be once they are defeated. In the seventh book, he is revealed to be the Mirror. He enters the Book of Everafter with Basil Grimm in the eighth book and, after being chased around the stories for a while by Sabrina, Daphne, and Puck, he forced the book's version of Bunny to place his spirit in Basil's body. Relda, however, let him possess her instead. Since Canis turned her into an Everafter, she couldn't leave the town, so he tried to steal the barrier spell from Jake Grimm. Eventually, Sabrina managed to get through to Granny, who expelled Mirror from her body. Without a vessel to possess, he died.
Moth: Moth is Puck's ex-fiancée and Oberon's killer. She despised Sabrina with every fiber of her being and was jealous that puck's chrysallis chose Sabrina over her. She also was about to kill Sabrina before Puck intervened.
Ebenezer Scrooge: A psychic that helps the Grimm family find Oberon's killer in the fourth book. He was a good friend of Veronica Grimm.

Awards
The Sisters Grimm series received many honors, including the Oppenheim Toy Portfolio Platinum Award and the Kirkus Reviews Best Fantasy Book award. The series is also a New York Times bestseller.

References

External links 
 

Abrams Books books
American children's novels
Book series introduced in 2005
Fantasy novel series
Fictional amateur detectives
Novels based on fairy tales
Series of children's books
Works based on Grimms' Fairy Tales